Progeryonidae is a small family of crabs in the order Decapoda. These crabs were until 2005 included in the Goneplacidae as part of the subfamily Carcinoplacinae. Three genera are included:
 Paragalene Kossmann, 1878 
 Progeryon Bouvier, 1922 
 Rhadinoplax Castro & Ng, 2008

References

Goneplacoidea
Decapod families